The Conference of the Birds or Speech of the Birds (Manṭiq-uṭ-Ṭayr, also known as  Maqāmāt-uṭ-Ṭuyūr; 1177) is a Persian poem by Sufi poet Farid ud-Din Attar, commonly known as Attar of Nishapur. The title is taken directly from the Qur’an, 27:16, where Sulayman (Solomon) and Dāwūd (David) are said to have been taught the language, or speech, of the birds (manṭiq al-ṭayr). Attar’s death, as with his life, is subject to speculation. He is known to have lived and died a violent death in the massacre inflicted by Genghis Khan and the Mongol army on the city of Nishapur in 1221, when he was seventy years old.

Synopsis
In the poem, the birds of the world gather to decide who is to be their sovereign, as they have none. The hoopoe, the wisest of them all, suggests that they should find the legendary Simorgh. The hoopoe leads the birds, each of whom represents a human fault which prevents humankind from attaining enlightenment.

The hoopoe tells the birds that they have to cross seven valleys in order to reach the abode of Simorgh. These valleys are as follows:

Sholeh Wolpé writes, "When the birds hear the description of these valleys, they bow their heads in distress; some even die of fright right then and there. But despite their trepidations, they begin the great journey. On the way, many perish of thirst, heat or illness, while others fall prey to wild beasts, panic, and violence. Finally, only thirty birds make it to the abode of Simorgh. In the end, the birds learn that they themselves are the Simorgh; the name “Simorgh” in Persian means thirty (si) birds (morgh). They eventually come to understand that the majesty of that Beloved is like the sun that can be seen reflected in a mirror. Yet, whoever looks into that mirror will also behold his or her own image."

Commentary
Attar's use of symbolism is a key, driving component of the poem. This handling of symbolisms and allusions can be seen reflected in these lines:

Beside the symbolic use of the Simorgh, the allusion to China is also very significant. According to Idries Shah, China as used here, is not the geographical China, but the symbol of mystic experience, as inferred from the Hadith (declared weak by Ibn Adee, but still used symbolically by some Sufis): "Seek knowledge; even as far as China".[5] There are many more examples of such subtle symbols and allusions throughout the Mantiq.
Within the larger context of the story of the journey of the birds, Attar masterfully tells the reader many didactic short, sweet stories in captivating poetic style.

Sholeh Wolpé, in the foreword of her modern translation of this work writes:

Wolpé further writes: "The book is meant to be not only instructive but also entertaining."

English translations

, reissued by Routledge and Kegan Paul Ltd, 1961.
, re-edited as The Canticle of the Birds, Diane de Sellier Éditeur, 2013.
.
.
.
.

La Conférence des oiseaux and other theatrical adaptations
Peter Brook and Jean-Claude Carrière adapted the poem into a play titled La Conférence des oiseaux (The Conference of the Birds), which they published in 1979. Brook toured embryonic versions of the play around rural Africa during the visit of his International Centre for Theatre Research to that continent in 1972–73, before presenting two extremely successful productions to Western audiences—one in New York City at La MaMa E.T.C., and one in Paris. John Heilpern gives an account of the events surrounding the early development of the play in his 1977 book Conference of the Birds: The Story of Peter Brook in Africa.

Sholeh Wolpe's stage adaptation of The Conference of the Birds was premiered by Inferno Theatre and Ubuntu Theater Project (now Oakland Theater Project), in Oakland California in November 2018.

Illustrations 
Collection at the Metropolitan Museum of Art, New York. Folio from an illustrated Persian manuscript dated c.1600. Paintings by Habiballah of Sava (active ca. 1590–1610), in ink, opaque watercolor, gold, and silver on paper, dimensions 25,4 x 11,4 cm.

See also

Language of the birds
Panentheism
Parlement of Foules
Persian literature
The Approach to Al-Mu'tasim
The Seven Valleys (Baháʼí Faith)

References

Sources
Attar, Conference of the Birds, translated by Sholeh Wolpé, W. W. Norton & Co 2017, 
Attar, Harvey & Masani, Conference of the Birds: A Seeker's Journey to God, Weiser Books, 2001, 
Farid Ud-Din-Attar, The Conference of The Birds - Mantiq Ut-Tair, English Translation by Charles Stanley Nott, First published 1954 by The Janus Press, London, Reissued by Routledge and Kegan Paul Ltd, 1961, 
 Fariduddin Attar in Great Poets of Classical Persian" by R M Chopra, 2014, Sparrow Publication, Kolkata, .

External links
Attar, the Sufi, the poet, World Literature Today
Bird Parliament Fitzgerald translation, at archive.org.
 Abridged Edward FitzGerald translation of Attar's Conference of the Birds
 Selection of Attar and related poets' poetry
 Simurgh: A modern musical rendering of Attar's allegorical tale
 Conference of the Birds, an opera by Johan Othman and libretto by William Radice
 Persian text of The Conference of Birds, with recitation in Persian by members of the Chamekhan Group.
 Presentation of The Canticle of the Birds, Diane de Sellier Éditeur, 2013

1170s books
Persian poems
Sufi literature
Attar of Nishapur
Poems about birds
The Conference of the Birds